Thalaina selenaea is a moth of the family Geometridae. It is found throughout eastern Australia, including Tasmania. Although the common name Satin Moth is used for this species, that name is already applied to Leucoma salicis, an unrelated species native to Europe and Asia. Thalaina selenaea is also called the Orange-rimmed Satin Moth

The wingspan is about 50 mm. Depending on the location, the adults are most common in autumn, particularly in April.

The larvae feed on Acacia dealbata and Acacia melanoxylon.

References

Nacophorini
Moths of Australia